Moonlighting is an American comedy drama television series that aired on ABC from March 3, 1985, to May 14, 1989. The network aired a total of 67 episodes. Starring Cybill Shepherd and Bruce Willis as private detectives, and Allyce Beasley as their quirky receptionist, the show was a mixture of drama, comedy, mystery, and romance, and was considered to be one of the first successful and influential examples of comedy drama, or "dramedy", emerging as a distinct television genre.
The show's theme song was co-written and performed by jazz singer Al Jarreau and became a hit. The show is also credited with making Willis a star and relaunching Shepherd's career after a string of lackluster projects. In 1997, the episode "The Dream Sequence Always Rings Twice" was ranked number 34 on TV Guide's 100 Greatest Episodes of All Time. In 2007, the series was listed as one of Time magazine's "100 Best TV Shows of All-Time". The relationship between the characters David and Maddie was included in TV Guides list of the best TV couples of all time.

Plot
The series revolved around cases investigated by the Blue Moon Detective Agency and its two partners, Madolyn "Maddie" Hayes (Shepherd) and David Addison Jr. (Willis). The show, with a mix of mystery, sharp dialogue, and sexual tension between its leads, introduced Willis to the world and brought Shepherd back into the spotlight after a nearly decade-long absence. The characters were introduced in a two-hour pilot episode.

The show's storyline begins with the reversal of fortune of Maddie Hayes, a former model who finds herself bankrupt after her accountant embezzles all her liquid assets. She is left saddled with several failing businesses formerly maintained as tax writeoffs, one of which is the City of Angels Detective Agency, helmed by the carefree David Addison. Between the pilot and the first one-hour episode, David persuades Maddie to keep the business and run it as a partnership. The agency is renamed Blue Moon Investigations because Maddie was most famous for being the spokesmodel for the Blue Moon Shampoo Company. In many episodes, she was recognized as "the Blue Moon shampoo girl," if not by name.

In his audio commentary for the Season 3 DVD, creator Glenn Gordon Caron says that the inspiration for the series was a production of The Taming of the Shrew he saw in Central Park starring Meryl Streep and Raúl Julia. The show parodied the play in the Season 3 episode Atomic Shakespeare.

Cast

Main cast
Cybill Shepherd as Madolyn "Maddie" Hayes, a chic, smart former high-fashion model. Left bankrupt when her accountant embezzles her money, she is forced to make a living by running the detective agency she owns as a tax writeoff. Using her celebrity as a former model, she brings in clients and tries to bring some order to a business previously run without any discipline. By the time he had written 50 pages for the pilot to the show, Caron says he realized he was writing the part for Shepherd. After reading the script, she immediately realized this was a part she wanted to do and, during her first meeting with Caron and producer Jay Daniel, remarked that it was reminiscent of a “Hawksian” comedy. The two had no idea what she was talking about, so she suggested they screen Twentieth Century, Bringing Up Baby, and His Girl Friday, three of her favorites, to see how the overlapping dialogue was handled. A week before shooting of the pilot began, Caron, Shepherd, and Willis watched Bringing Up Baby and His Girl Friday.

Bruce Willis as David Addison Jr., a wise-cracking detective running the City of Angels Detective Agency. Faced with the prospect of being put out of business, he convinces Maddie that they lost money only because they were supposed to and talks her into rebranding the agency and going into business with him as her partner. Caron had to fight with ABC to put Willis in the lead role, having already signed Shepherd for the pilot and series. Caron claims he tested Willis about a third of the way through over 2,000 actors, knew "this was the guy" immediately, and had to fight through twice as many more acting tests and readings while arguing with ABC executives before receiving conditional authorization to cast Willis in the pilot. According to Caron, ABC did not feel that viewers would find any sexual tension between Shepherd and Willis believable.
Allyce Beasley as Agnes DiPesto, the agency's extremely loyal and quirky receptionist who always answers the phone in rhyme. In season two, it is revealed that she lives at 6338 Hope Street. As problems arose with getting Willis and Shepherd on screen due to personal issues, the writers started to focus on the relationship between Agnes and fellow Blue Moon employee Herbert Viola. In the series finale, Agnes berates Maddie and David for not being able to figure out their relationship as the entire set is dismantled and says, “if there’s a God in heaven, he’ll spin Herbert and me off in our own series.”
Curtis Armstrong as Herbert Viola, who started at Blue Moon as an employee from a temp agency. The producers brought Armstrong in based on his work in Revenge of the Nerds and Better Off Dead, hoping to expand the role of DiPesto by giving her a love interest, thereby taking some of the pressure off Willis and Shepherd. As Herbert begins to shine in his duties, he gets promoted to junior detective. Debuting in season three, he appeared in 36 of the series' 67 episodes.
Jack Blessing as MacGillicudy, a Blue Moon employee who became a foil for Viola and a rival for DiPesto's affections. Debuting in season three, he appeared in 17 of the series’ 67 episodes.

Guest cast
In addition to the primary cast, several notable actors appeared either as guest stars or made cameos on the series.

Recurring roles:
 Charles Rocket as Richard Addison, David's brother.
 Eva Marie Saint and Robert Webber as Virginia and Alexander Hayes, Maddie's parents.
 Mark Harmon appeared near the end of Season 3 as Sam Crawford, Maddie's romantic interest and rival with David.
 Dennis Dugan as Walter Bishop, who dates then marries Maddie
 Brooke Adams appeared in Season 4 as Terri Knowles, a single mother for whom David volunteered as a Lamaze partner in preparation for the birth of Maddie's child.
 Virginia Madsen appeared in Season 5 as Annie Charnock, Maddie's cousin and a short-term romantic interest for David.
One-time roles:
 Liz Sheridan as Selma in the pilot episode.
 Mary Hart as herself in the pilot episode.
 Tim Robbins as a hitman in the Season 1 episode  "Gunfight at the So-So Corral".
 C. Thomas Howell as a waiter (uncredited) in the Season 2 episode "The Lady in the Iron Mask". and as a postal worker (uncredited) in the Season 3 episode "Yours, Very Deadly".
 Orson Welles as himself delivering the cold open in the Season 2 episode "The Dream Sequence Always Rings Twice". It was Welles's last appearance before his death.
 Barbara Bain as Emily Grayson in the Season 2 episode "My Fair David".
 Dana Delany as Jillian Armstrong in the Season 2 episode "Knowing Her".
 David Patrick Kelly as McBride in the Season 2 episode "Somewhere Under the Rainbow".
 Dan Lauria as the Lieutenant in the Season 2 episode "Portrait of Maddie".
 Mark Linn-Baker as Phil West in the Season 2 episode "Atlas Belched".
 Richard Belzer as Leonard in the Season 2 episode "Twas the Episode Before Christmas".
 Whoopi Goldberg as Camille Brand in the Season 2 episode "Camille".
 Judd Nelson as a Police Officer in the Season 2 episode "Camille".
 Billy Barty as himself in the Season 2 episode "Camille".
 Paul Sorvino as David Addison Sr. in the Season 3 episode "The Son Also Rises".
 The Temptations as themselves in the Season 3 episode "Symphony in Knocked Flat".
 Don King as himself in the Season 3 episode "Symphony in Knocked Flat".
 Brad Dourif as Father McDonovan in the Season 3 episode "All Creatures Great and… Not So Great".
 Rick Ducommun as one of David's friends in the Season 3 episode "Big Man On Mulberry Street".
 Sandahl Bergman appeared in a "dream" dance sequence in the Season 3 episode "Big Man On Mulberry Street".
 Colm Meaney as one of Katharina's suitors in the Season 3 episode "Atomic Shakespeare".
 Sterling Holloway as the Narrator in the Season 3 episode "Atomic Shakespeare".
 Lionel Stander as Max in the Season 3 episode "It's a Wonderful Job".
 Cheryl Tiegs as herself in the Season 3 episode "It's a Wonderful Job".
 Pierce Brosnan as Remington Steele in the Season 3 episode "The Straight Poop".
 Peter Bogdanovich as himself in the Season 3 episode "The Straight Poop".
 Rona Barrett as herself in the Season 3 episode "The Straight Poop".
 Donna Dixon as Joan Tenowitz in the Season 3 episode "Blonde on Blonde".
 Sam McMurray as Moe Hyman in the Season 3 episode "Blonde on Blonde".
 Robert Wuhl as the Nut in Holding Cell in the Season 3 episode "Blonde on Blonde".
 Jeff Jarvis as himself in the Season 3 episode "Sam & Dave".
 Randall 'Tex' Cobb as "Big Guy in Gas Station" in the Season 3 episode "Sam & Dave".
 Gary Cole as Alan McClafferty in the Season 3 episode "Maddie's Turn to Cry".
 William Hickey as Mr. Kendall in the Season 3 episode "To Heiress Human".
 Dr. Joyce Brothers as herself in the Season 4 episode "A Trip to the Moon".
 Ray Charles as himself in the Season 4 episode "A Trip to the Moon".
 John Goodman as Donald Chase in the Season 4 episode "Come Back Little Shiksa".
 Amanda Plummer as Jacqueline "Jackie" Wilbourne in the Season 4 episode "Take a Left at the Altar".
 Terry O'Quinn as Bryant "Brian" Wilbourne in the Season 4 episode "Take a Left at the Altar".
 Imogene Coca as Clara DiPesto in the Season 4 episode "Los Dos DiPestos".
 Michelle Johnson as Mrs. Hunziger in the Season 5 episode "Plastic Fantastic Lovers".
 Jennifer Tilly as Nurse Saundra in the Season 5 episode "Plastic Fantastic Lovers".
 Colleen Dewhurst as Betty Russell in the Season 5 episode "Take My Wife, For Example".
 Rita Wilson as Carla in the Season 5 episode "Those Lips, Those Lies".
 Demi Moore, Bruce Willis's wife at the time, as the woman in the elevator in the Season 5 episode "When Girls Collide".
 Timothy Leary as minister Wynn Deaupayne in the Season 5 episode "Lunar Eclipse".
 Robert Ellenstein as Heinz in the Pilot episode
 Bill Erwin as Duncan Kennedy in the season 5 episode: "Perfetc"

Episodes

Format innovations

The series was created by Glenn Gordon Caron, one of the producers of the similar Remington Steele, when he was approached by ABC executive Lewis H. Erlicht. Erlicht liked the work Caron had done on Taxi and Remington Steele and wanted a detective show featuring a major star in a leading role who would appeal to an upscale audience. Caron wanted to do a romance, to which Erlicht replied “I don’t care what it is, as long as it’s a detective show.”

The tone of the series was left up to the production staff, resulting in Moonlighting becoming one of the first successful TV "dramedies"— dramatic-comedy, a style of television and movies in which there is an equal or nearly equal balance of humor and serious content. The show made use of fast-paced, overlapping dialogue between the two leads, harking back to classic screwball comedy films such as those of director Howard Hawks. These innovative qualities resulted in its being nominated, for the first time in the 50-year history of the Directors Guild of America, for both Best Drama and Best Comedy in the same year (both in 1985 and 1986).

Breaking the fourth wall

Moonlighting frequently broke the fourth wall, with many episodes including dialogue that made direct references to the scriptwriters, the audience, the network, or the series itself. (For example, when a woman is trying to commit suicide by jumping into a bathtub with a television playing The Three Stooges, Addison says, "The Stooges? Are you nuts? The network'll never let you do that, lady!")

Cold opens sometimes featured Shepherd and Willis (in character as Maddie Hayes and David Addison), other actors, viewers, or TV critics directly addressing the audience about the show's production itself. These cold opens were originally borne out of desperation as a way to fill air time, since the dialogue on the show was spoken so quickly and the producers needed something to fill the entire hour. In some episodes, the production crew and sets become involved in the plot.

Fantasy
The series also embraced fantasy; in season two, the show aired "The Dream Sequence Always Rings Twice," an episode that features two lengthy and elaborately produced black-and-white dream sequences. David and Maddie are told about a murder that occurred in the 1940s by the inheritor of the then-famous nightclub where the murder took place. Maddie and David feud over whether the man or woman who was executed for the crime was the real murderer. The two dream sequences present each detective's version of how the murder took place. They were filmed on black-and-white film stock so that they would look like true period films. (On the commentary on the DVD, it is said that they used black-and-white film instead of color so that the network would not later use the color film.)

Fearing fan reaction to a popular show being shown in black and white, ABC demanded a disclaimer be made at the beginning of the episode to inform viewers of the "black-and-white" gimmick for the episode. The show's producers hired Orson Welles to deliver the introduction, which aired a few days after the actor's death.

"Atomic Shakespeare" features the cast performing a variation of The Taming of the Shrew, with David in the role of Petruchio, Maddie as Katharina, Agnes as Bianca, and Herbert as Lucentio. The episode features Shakespearean costumes and mixed the plot with humorous anachronisms and variations on Moonlightings own running gags. The characters perform the dialogue in iambic pentameter, and the episode is wrapped by segments featuring a boy imagining the episode's proceedings because his mother forced him to do his Shakespeare homework instead of watching Moonlighting.

Other
In addition, the show mocked its connection to the Remington Steele series by having Pierce Brosnan hop networks and make a cameo appearance as Steele in one episode. The show also acknowledged Hart to Hart as an influence: in the episode "It's a Wonderful Job," based on the film It's a Wonderful Life, Maddie's guardian angel showed her an alternate reality in which Jonathan and Jennifer Hart from the earlier series had taken over Blue Moon's lease. Although Robert Wagner and Stefanie Powers did not appear in the episode, Lionel Stander reprised his role as the Harts' assistant Max.

Both Shepherd and Willis sang musical numbers over the course of the show. In "The Dream Sequence Always Rings Twice," Shepherd performed both "Blue Moon" in Maddie's dream sequence and "I Told Ya I Love Ya, Now Get Out" in David's, while in "Atomic Shakespeare," Willis sings The Young Rascals' "Good Lovin'". Willis also frequently broke into shorter snippets of Motown songs. "Good Lovin'," "Blue Moon", and "I Told Ya I Love Ya..." appeared on the Moonlighting Soundtrack.

The episode "Big Man on Mulberry Street" centers around a production dance number set to the Billy Joel song of the same name. The sequence was directed by musical director Stanley Donen.

Production
Moonlighting was unusual at the time for being one of only three shows, due to FCC regulations limiting the practice, to be owned and produced in-house by a broadcast network (NBC’s Punky Brewster and CBS’s Twilight Zone revival being the others). This allowed the network greater flexibility in budgeting the show since the “back-end potential” for profits was so much greater with not having to pay a licensing fee to the film studio or independent production company. As a result, ABC gave Caron a lot of control over production. Caron, however, was a perfectionist and viewed Moonlighting as the filming of a one-hour movie every week, using techniques usually reserved for big budget films. To capture the cinematic feel of the films of the 1940s, for example, he would prohibit the use of a zoom lens, opting instead to use more time-consuming moving master cameras that move back and forth on a track and require constant resetting of the lights. Diffusion disks were used to soften Cybill Shepherd's features, and a special lens needed to be employed so that in a two shot, Maddie would be diffused and David would not.

Much of the credit for this look and feel can be attributed to the hiring of Gerald Finnerman as the director of photography. Finnerman, a second-generation cinematographer, was brought up in the old school of cinematography by working with his father, Perry Finnerman, and later as a camera operator for Harry Stradling on such films as My Fair Lady and The Picture of Dorian Gray. Finnerman would then go on to be the director of photography for the TV series Star Trek and was responsible for creating much of the mood in that show by employing black-and-white lighting techniques for color film. This background meshed perfectly with what Caron was trying to portray in the series and earned him an Emmy nomination for the black-and-white episode “The Dream Sequence Always Rings Twice”. Hired for the show after the pilot was shot, Finnerman would become involved in virtually every aspect of the show including the scripts, lighting, set design, and even directing some of the later episodes.

Typical scripts for an average one-hour television show run 60 pages, but those for Moonlighting were nearly twice as long due to the fast talking overlapping dialogue of the main characters. While the average television show would take seven days to shoot, Moonlighting would take from 12 to 14 days to complete with episodes and dialogue frequently being written by Caron the same day they were shot. This attention to detail contributed to Moonlighting as being one of the most expensive television shows being produced at the time. Where most episodes would cost around $900,000 to produce, Moonlighting was running nearly double that. The season 2 episode "The Dream Sequence Always Rings Twice" could have been filmed much more cheaply by being shot in color and then decolorized, but Caron insisted on the authentic look of black-and-white film which took 16 days to shoot, bringing the cost of the episode to the then-unheard-of sum of two million dollars. Caron often defended his filming practices in the name of giving the audience what they wanted and producing a quality product. He used the following analogy to illustrate the point, "The thinking in television which makes no damn sense to me, is that a half hour of television costs X, and an hour of television costs Y, no matter what that television is, it strikes me as an insane hypothesis. The parallel is, you're hungry, whether you go to McDonald's or whether you go to '21,' it should cost the same; they both fill your stomach. It's nonsense."

All of this attention to detail resulted in production delays and the show became notorious for airing reruns when new episodes had not been completed in time for broadcast. The first two seasons of Moonlighting focused almost entirely on the two main characters, having them appear in almost every scene. According to Cybill Shepherd, "I left home at 5 A.M. each day. Moonlighting scripts were close to a hundred pages, half again as long as the average one-hour television series. Almost from the moment the cameras started rolling we were behind schedule, sometimes completing as few as sixteen episodes per season, and never achieving the standard twenty-two."

Glenn Gordon Caron partly blamed Cybill Shepherd for production problems:

"I don't mean to paint her as the sole bearer of responsibility for the discord. But if I said to you, 'You're going to have a great new job – it's a life-defining job – but you're going to work 14–15 hours a day, and by the way, you'll never know what hours those are – sometimes you'll start at noon and work until 3 a.m., other times you won't know when or where it will be [until the last minute].' It can be very difficult, it requires an amazing amount of stamina. It's easier to do if you're still reaching for the stars, it's a lot tougher if you're already a star, if you've already reached the top of the mountain."

Producer Jay Daniel talked about the difficulties between the costars in the later seasons: "Well, I was the guy that more often than not would be the one that would go into the lions den when they were having disagreements. I'd sort of be the referee, try to resolve it so that we could get back to work. So there was that side of it. Everybody knows there was friction between the two of them on the stage. In the beginning, Bruce was just a guy’s guy. Let's just say he evolved. Over the years, he went from being the crew's best friend and just being grateful for the work and all of that to realizing that he was going to be a movie star and wanting to move on. Part of that was because of his strained relationship with Cybill. That sometimes made the set a very unpleasant place to be. Cybill – I got along with her very well at times, other times I’d have to be the one who said you have to come out of the trailer and go to work. In fairness to her, she was in the makeup chair at six thirty in the morning with pages of dialogue she hadn’t seen before, she'd work very long hours, and then be back in the makeup chair at six thirty the next morning."

The delays became so great that even ABC mocked the lateness with an ad campaign showing network executives waiting impatiently for the arrival of new episodes at ABC's corporate headquarters. One episode featured television critic Jeff Jarvis in an introduction, sarcastically reminding viewers what was going on with the show's plot since it had been so long since the last new episode.

The season three clipshow episode "The Straight Poop" also made fun of the episode delays by having Hollywood columnist Rona Barrett drop by the Blue Moon Detective Agency to figure out why David and Maddie couldn't get along, as the premise to set up the clips from earlier episodes. In the end, Rona convinced them to apologize to one another, and promised the viewers that there would be an all-new episode the following week.

Shepherd's real-life pregnancy and a skiing accident in which Willis broke his clavicle further contributed to production delays. To counter these problems, with the fourth season, the writers began to focus more of the show's attention on supporting cast members Agnes and Herbert, writing several episodes focusing on the two so that the show would be able to have episodes ready for airing.

Ratings and decline
Moonlighting was a hit with TV audiences as well as with critics and industry insiders, with 16 Emmy nominations for the second season which saw Moonlighting tie for 20th place in the Nielsen ratings. In season three, the show peaked at 9th, then dropped off slightly to tie for 12th in the 4th season. By the end of the final season, the show was 49th in the ratings.

The show's ratings decline is popularly attributed to Episode #14 of Season 3, "I Am Curious… Maddie", which infamously had Maddie and David consummate their relationship after two and a half years of romantic tension. In commentaries on the third season DVD set, Caron disputed that the event led to the show's decline, but that a number of other factors led to the series' decline and eventual cancellation. In the fourth season, Willis and Shepherd had scant screen time together.  Jay Daniel explained that:  Bruce Willis was filming Die Hard during this period. When the film became a blockbuster, a film career beckoned and his desire to continue in a weekly series waned. In a series that depended on the chemistry between the two main stars, not having them together for the bulk of the fourth season hurt the ratings.

The series lost Glenn Gordon Caron as executive producer and head writer when he left the show over difficulties with the production:  Shepherd recalled Caron left the show stating that it was either him or her, and he did not think the network would choose him.

When Maddie returned to Los Angeles near the end of the fourth season, the writers tried to recreate the tension between Maddie and David by having Maddie spontaneously marry a man named Walter Bishop (Dennis Dugan) within a few hours of meeting him on the train back to Los Angeles. When Shepherd read the script, she strongly voiced her objection that her character would not do such a thing, but was overruled. The move failed to rekindle the sparks between the main characters or capture the interest of the audience, which led to an even further ratings decline.

Cancellation
Neither of the principal stars was fully committed to the final season of the show. Bruce Willis, fresh from his Die Hard success, wanted to make more films. Cybill Shepherd, having just given birth to twins, had grown tired of the long, grueling production days and was ready for the series to end.

In the 1988–1989 TV season, the show's ratings declined precipitously.  The March to August 1988 Writers Guild of America strike cancelled plans for the 1987–1988 Moonlighting season finale to be filmed and aired on TV in 3-D in a deal with Coca-Cola, and delayed the broadcast of the first new episode until December 6, 1988.  The series went on hiatus during the February sweeps, and returned on Sunday evenings in the spring of 1989.  Six more episodes aired before the series was cancelled in May of that year.

In keeping with the show's tradition of "breaking the fourth wall", the last episode (fittingly titled "Lunar Eclipse") featured Maddie and David returning from Agnes and Herbert's wedding to find the Blue Moon sets being taken away, and an ABC network executive waiting to tell them that the show has been cancelled.  The characters then race through the studio lot in search of a television producer named Cy, as the world of Moonlighting is slowly dismantled.

When they find Cy, he is screening a print of "In 'n Outlaws", the episode of Moonlighting that had aired two weeks earlier. Once informed of the problem, Cy lectures David and Maddie on the perils of losing their audience and the fragility of romance. Cy was played by Dennis Dugan, the same actor who had played Walter Bishop in Maddie's marriage storyline — however, Dugan was also the director of the episode, so his acting credit was listed as "Walter Bishop". David and Maddie then admit  defeat that  the show is ending but not before Maddie tells David 'I can't imagine not seeing you again tomorrow' and then we are treated to a clip montage of previous Moonlighting episodes and then it ends with a message  stating that "Blue Moon Investigations ceased operations on May 14, 1989. The Anselmo Case was never solved… and remains a mystery to this day."

Syndication
As the show had not produced enough episodes to gain a syndication contract, following its original run it was not widely seen until its DVD release, although it occasionally appeared on cable channels targeting women (including Lifetime and Bravo in the US, and W in Canada) in the 1990s and 2000s.  Bravo airings often featured new claymation promos with Maddie and David using original audio clips from the series.  The "Atomic Shakespeare" episode aired on Nick at Nite in 2005 as part of the network's 20th anniversary celebration.  The 1985 ABC Tuesday night line-up was honored with reruns of Who's the Boss?, Growing Pains, and Moonlighting, although "Atomic Shakespeare" was from the '86-'87 season.

BBC Two initially carried the show in the UK from 1986 to 1989, and it ran on Sky 1 circa 1991. It has been shown on CBS Drama since November 2009.  Between 2005 and 2008, the show was frequently shown on the now defunct channel ABC1. TVNZ aired the show in New Zealand in its entirety in the 1980s, and repeated it in 2004. In Asia, Moonlighting began airing Seasons 1 and 2 on Rewind Network's HITS channel in December 2013.

Awards and nominations

Moonlighting was nominated for a wide range of awards, including nominations for 40 Emmy Awards of which it won 6. It was also nominated for 10 Golden Globe Awards of which it won 3.

Home media
Anchor Bay Entertainment released the original pilot episode on DVD in region 1. Lions Gate Entertainment later released the entire series of Moonlighting, including the pilot episode, on DVD in Region 1.  Each release contains bonus features including commentaries and featurettes.  As of 2013, these releases have been discontinued and are out of print.

In Regions 2 & 4, Sony Pictures Home Entertainment has released all 5 seasons on DVD, although the Region 4 sets are now out of print.  A complete series box set was also released in Region 2 on September 14, 2009.

The series is noticeably unavailable to stream, rent or buy on any service currently due to the costly music licensing. However, on October 5, 2022, Caron posted on his official Twitter account that work had begun to prepare all five seasons of the series for streaming.

Parodies
Riptide, a once-popular detective series whose ratings had declined to the point of cancellation after airing against Moonlighting in the 1985–1986 television season, aired an episode (the show's penultimate) in 1986, in which that show's detectives acted as mentors to "Rosalind Grant" (Annette McCarthy) and "Cary Russell" (H. Richard Greene), the bickering stars of a television detective show pilot. Although their names were an allusion to Cary Grant and Rosalind Russell, the characters were written as parodies of Shepherd and Willis, even adopting some of their real mannerisms and clothing styles, and their dialogue contained many nods, both obvious and subtle, to Moonlighting's writing style. The episode was explicitly promoted by NBC (Riptide's network) as a Moonlighting parody, and was publicized as such widely enough that Riptide's producers felt obliged to clarify that they liked Moonlighting and intended the episode as an homage. The episode was even titled "If You Can't Beat 'Em, Join 'Em".

The series even spawned a porn parody entitled "Moonlusting" in 1987, directed by Henri Pachard and starring Taija Rae as Hattie Mays and Jerry Butler as David Madison, together running the New Poon Detective Agency. The dynamic of the main characters mirrored that of Shepherd and Willis, even down to breaking the fourth wall and addressing viewers directly.

 See also 
 List of Moonlighting episodes
 Moonlighting soundtrack
 Detective couple, Nick and Nora Charles

ReferencesNotesFurther reading'

External links

Moonlighting in the Encyclopedia of Television

1980s American comedy-drama television series
1980s American mystery television series
1980s American romantic comedy television series
1980s American workplace comedy television series
1980s American workplace drama television series
1985 American television series debuts
1989 American television series endings
American Broadcasting Company original programming
American detective television series
English-language television shows
Metafictional television series
Primetime Emmy Award-winning television series
Television series about couples
Television series by Disney–ABC Domestic Television
Television shows set in Los Angeles
Television shows scored by Alf Clausen